David Eugene Edwards (born February 24, 1968 in Englewood, Colorado) is an American musician.

He is the lead singer of Wovenhand, and also the main songwriter and the principal musician on the recordings of the band. He is the former lead singer of 16 Horsepower.  Their music contains elements of old-time, folk, punk, medieval, gypsy, Native American music, and most recently late 1980s and early 1990s Gothic Rock. Lyrically, it deals with pain, conflict, faith, and redemption, with Edwards' personal Christian beliefs influencing much of the lyrical imagery.

Edwards, along with Jean-Yves Tola and Pascal Humbert (together as 16 Horsepower) performs on the soundtrack to the Jim White-inspired film Searching for the Wrong-Eyed Jesus, playing the traditional "Wayfarin' Stranger."  He also appears in the film, playing a fragment of "Phyllis Ruth," a 16 Horsepower song from 1997's Low Estate.

In 2012, he became a member of Crime & the City Solution. In 2018, Edwards and co-member Alexander Hacke released an album called Risha.

In 2020, Edwards collaborated with Carpenter Brut, a French synthwave artist.  They created a song and video called Fab Tool, to which Edwards contributed lyrically as well as vocally.

Early life 
Edwards was born in 1968 in Englewood, Colorado, the grandson of a traveling Nazarene preacher. He grew up in the church and often traveled with his grandfather. The music of the church became a major influence on the music he produced as an adult. “The music in church as a kid was always the part of church that really spoke to me, just the words of the music and the music itself. And early on, it was real somber music, just an organ and singing, and singing hymns from the 1600s. That’s pretty much what I do now too. Yeah, that was a big influence, really, and I still love that music — probably it’s my favorite music, really," he told Issue magazine.

His family later attended a Baptist church. Through these experiences, he developed an early and intensely personal relationship with Christianity. "I never felt holy or anything like that. But I knew I was saved. I was saved when I was five years old. And I've never had a doubt since then. It stays with me now. It's all dealt with by the Son. One day, the sun was coming through the window. I was in a basement, and up there at the top the sun was coming through the window. It was morning and the sun was just coming up. And the Lord showed me who he was," he told Crossrhythms.

Edwards worked in a variety of jobs before becoming a full-time musician, including ditch digger, dishwasher, carpenter and janitor. He did not finish high school.

Faith 
Edwards remains deeply Christian, and occasionally talks to the press about his faith and its relationship to his music. “Religion is kind of a weird word today … you know I grew up in the Church. My Grandfather was the preacher of the Church that I went to. It was small and he led the music. Socially, that was a major part of my life. There are a lot of people that grow up in the Church or whatever and they don’t care about it or they don’t follow it. Just because your parents believe doesn’t mean you are going to. But I have always believed in it, in the Bible, and it’s a huge part of my life, it affects everything I do. There is no separation between it and my regular life … you know what I mean … That’s what I sing about," he told Issue.

When asked by another journalist about his beliefs, Edwards said, "Christ is the gate out of Hell. He is the way. He is the Son. He is the virgin-born one. He is the shepherd king. He is the son of God. All of this is man's imagery that God has entered into. This is how he has shown himself to be who he is. And this is just because of the fallen state that we are in. That's what he has had to do. It's as simple as that. He shows himself to be other, and his world and his life is other, and it's not going to take place in this reality right here. This reality has been given to another. The gifts and the callings of God are irrevocable."

Despite the Christian themes that run through Edwards' music with 16 Horsepower and Wovenhand, he says Christian music communities have never embraced his work—and neither has the secular music world. “The Christian community has never liked my music, and the secular world has never accepted it because it has a Christian bent to it. So neither camp wants it. There’s nothing I can do about it. It’s just what I do. I’m not gonna try to appease either side.”

Personal life 
Edwards is married; his wife's name is Leah. He has two children, including Asher, born in 1987, and Elijah, born in 1997. Asher played strings on 16 Horsepower's album Secret South and appears in the videos for the band's songs "Haw" and "Clogger."

Discography

Albums
 16 Horsepower:
 Horsepower EP (CD/vinyl - 1995)
 Sackcloth 'n' Ashes (CD - 1995)
 Low Estate (CD - 1997)
 Secret South (CD/vinyl - 2000)
 Hoarse (CD - 2000)
 Folklore (CD/vinyl - 2002)
 Olden (CD/vinyl - 2003)
 Woven Hand:
 Woven Hand (2002)
 Blush Music (2003)
 Blush (Original Score) (2003)
 Consider the Birds (2004)
 Mosaic (2006)
 Puur (2006)
 Ten Stones (2008)
 The Threshingfloor (2010)
 Live at Roepaen (2012)
 The Laughing Stalk (2012)
 Refractory Obdurate (2014)
 Star Treatment (2016)
 With Alexander Hacke:
 Risha (2018)

Singles
 16 Horsepower:
 "Shametown" (vinyl 7" - 1994)
 "Black Soul Choir" (CD - 1996)
 "Haw" (vinyl - 1996)
 "For Heaven's Sake" (CD - 1997)
 "Coal Black Horses" (CD - 1997)
 "The Partisan" (CD - 1998)
 "Clogger" (CD - 2000)
 "Splinters" (CD - 2001)

Video
 16 Horsepower/Woven hand
 Black Soul Choir and Haw (1995)
 16HP DVD (2005)
 Live DVD (2006)
 Live at Roepaen DVD+CD (2012)

References

External links

Woven Hand site
Splendid Feature

1968 births
Living people
People from Englewood, Colorado
American alternative country singers
American country singer-songwriters
American performers of Christian music
Chemnitzer concertina players
Crime & the City Solution members
Singer-songwriters from Colorado